Jeremy Samuel Piven (born July 26, 1965) is an American actor. He is best known for his role as Ari Gold in the comedy series Entourage, for which he won a Golden Globe Award and three consecutive Emmy Awards. He also starred in the British period drama Mr Selfridge, which tells the story of the man who created the English department store Selfridges, and portrayed Spence Kovak on Ellen DeGeneres's sitcom Ellen.

Early years 
Piven was born in Manhattan and raised in a Reconstructionist Jewish family of Ukrainian Jewish descent.

His parents are Byrne Piven (1929–2002) and Joyce Hiller Piven (née Goldstein), both of whom were actors and drama teachers. His elder sister is director Shira Piven, whom he has described as one of his first acting teachers; his brother-in-law is director Adam McKay.

He grew up in Evanston, Illinois, and graduated from Evanston Township High School. As a teenager, he attended Harand Theater Camp in Elkhart Lake, Wisconsin, where he played Bernardo in West Side Story. In Illinois, he trained at Piven Theatre Workshop, founded by his parents. He also attended Drake University in Des Moines, Iowa, where he departed after his sophomore year to attend New York University's Tisch School of the Arts. He left Tisch during his senior year to pursue his acting career and is an alumnus of the Pi Kappa Alpha fraternity. He spent a semester at the National Theater Institute at the Eugene O'Neill Theater Center in Waterford, Connecticut.

He has appeared in a number of films with John Cusack, who is also from Evanston and is a fellow alumnus of the Piven Theatre Workshop (as are Cusack's sisters Joan and Ann). Piven and Cusack once shared an apartment and have been friends since high school.

Career 
One of Piven's early roles was Spike in Lucas (1986). His first important role came in 1992 when he became a regular cast member on HBO's The Larry Sanders Show, where he played head writer Jerry. He left the show in the second season after growing tired of the role, because his character was not given much of a background.

In 1993, he portrayed George Costanza on the show-within-a-show scene in the two-part Seinfeld episode "The Pilot". He was a supporting cast member on the last three seasons of the sitcom Ellen, where he played Ellen's cousin Spence. He also starred in and produced the short-lived ABC dramedy series Cupid, and voiced Elongated Man in three episodes of Justice League Unlimited.

Beginning in 2004, Piven achieved significant success as the fast-talking, acerbic Hollywood agent Ari Gold in the HBO series Entourage. He received Emmy nominations for Best Supporting Actor for four straight years, from 2005 to 2008, and won the award in 2006, 2007 and 2008. He also received Golden Globe nominations for the role from 2005 to 2010, and won in 2008.

Piven has appeared in numerous successful films, including Grosse Pointe Blank, Singles, Very Bad Things, The Family Man, Black Hawk Down, The Kingdom, Heat, PCU, Old School, Rock N Rolla, Serendipity, Smokin' Aces, and Runaway Jury. He has also made cameo appearances in Rush Hour 2 and the U.S. release of Cars.

In 2007, Piven appeared in the video for "Drivin' Me Wild", the third single from rapper Common's seventh album, Finding Forever. The two were co-stars in Smokin' Aces and appeared together when Piven hosted SNL in January 2007.

Piven appeared in the first Broadway revival of David Mamet's Speed-the-Plow. The production began preview performances on October 3, 2008, and opened on October 23, 2008; the play was due to run through February 22, 2009. After Piven missed several performances, on December 17, 2008, Piven's representation announced that due to an undisclosed illness, Piven would be ending his run in the play effective immediately. The illness was revealed to be hydrargyria, a disease caused by exposure to mercury or its compounds, though the source is unknown. Rumours have indicated that the high level of mercury could potentially have been caused by Piven's habit of consuming fish twice a day for the past 20 years. An alternative explanation is that the herbal remedies Piven was taking were responsible for his high levels of mercury. Mamet joked that Piven was leaving the play "to pursue a career as a thermometer." On September 1, 2009, Piven, in a guest appearance on the Late Show with David Letterman, explained that he had given up red meat and poultry, and had been getting all of his protein from fish for the past 20 years.

On August 3, 2009, Piven guest hosted the WWE Raw wrestling program. In August 2011, he stated he was interested in portraying the drummer from the Who, Keith Moon. From 2013 to 2016, he played the title role in the British television drama series Mr Selfridge, the semi-fictional story based on the life of Harry Selfridge, who founded the London department store Selfridge's. The show aired on the ITV network in the United Kingdom and on PBS in the United States.

On August 1, 2019, Piven appeared on a KTVU morning news segment to promote a standup comedy show he was to perform in the next night in San Francisco.

Personal life 
Piven starred in the Travel Channel special Jeremy Piven's Journey of a Lifetime, which detailed his journey across India. He resides in Malibu, California.

Piven plays drums and has played on stage with the notable Chicago-based progressive rock / jam band Umphrey's McGee in 2004.

In 2016, Piven endorsed Senator Bernie Sanders for President of the United States during the 2016 presidential election.

Piven is a fan of the Chicago Bears. In 1998, he appeared in commercials for the Chicago Blackhawks.

Sexual assault allegations
On October 30, 2017, adult film actress and reality television personality Ariane Bellamar made accusations via Twitter that Piven had groped her. The next day, Piven responded to these allegations, writing: "I unequivocally deny the appalling allegations being peddled about me. It did not happen". Cassidy Freeman came to Bellamar's defense in an Instagram post, stating that Piven engaged in "predatory behavior" toward her when she was "far too young". On November 9, advertising executive Tiffany Bacon Scourby alleged that Piven had attacked her in 2003, stating that he had "jumped on" her, "exposed his genitals, held her hands down and began rubbing against her body until he ejaculated". Piven responded to the allegations, calling them "absolutely false and completely fabricated". A representative for Piven said the actor was "looking at legal options".

On November 13, 2017, Piven voluntarily took a polygraph test in which he was asked a series of questions about each allegation and again denied them. He passed the test with "no signs of deception". The polygraph test was administered by a member of the American Polygraph Association.

Later that month, Anastasia Taneie, who worked as an extra on Entourage, alleged that Piven "confronted her in a dark hallway and groped her breast and genitals as he forcefully pushed her against a wall". On November 27, 2017, CBS decided not to order a full season of Wisdom of the Crowd following weak ratings and allegations of sexual harassment involving Piven. 

In January 2018, BuzzFeed published an article in which three more women accused Piven of "sexual misconduct or inappropriate behavior". They alleged Piven pinned down one woman on a couch after following her to her trailer on the set of a film in 1985, engaged in "physically aggressive" behavior with another while on a date, and attempted to force himself on the third woman in a hotel room around 1994. BuzzFeed News corroborated the stories with eight people who said the women had shared the encounters with them in the years since. 

Piven "vehemently denied" all the allegations, and his lawyer called them "works of fiction", saying they were opportunistic efforts to "obtain attention and/or money". Piven submitted a written statement to BuzzFeed in which he referred to the lie detector test he had taken and asserted: "I have never forced myself on anyone, nor have I ever exposed myself or restrained anyone against their will. To the contrary, if any woman ever said no, I stopped".

Filmography

Film

Television

Awards and nominations

References

External links 

 
 
 
 
 
 
 Interview on WHO.com with Jeremy Piven and Doug Ellin
 Piven on "Speed-The-Plow" and Mercury Poisoning at Yahoo!
 

1965 births
20th-century American male actors
21st-century American male actors
American Buddhists
American male film actors
American male television actors
American male voice actors
American people of Ukrainian-Jewish descent
American Reconstructionist Jews
Television producers from New York City
Best Supporting Actor Golden Globe (television) winners
Drake University alumni
Evanston Township High School alumni
Jewish American male actors
Living people
Male actors from Chicago
Male actors from New York City
Outstanding Performance by a Supporting Actor in a Comedy Series Primetime Emmy Award winners
Tisch School of the Arts alumni
Television producers from Illinois